The Men's Downhill B3 was one of the events held in Alpine skiing at the 1988 Winter Paralympics in Innsbruck.

There were 6 competitors in the final.

Italy's Bruno Oberhammer set a time of 49.48, taking the gold medal.

Results

Final

References 

Downhill